Jamila Lunkuse (born 1 January 1997) is a Ugandan swimmer. She competed in the women's 50m freestyle at the 2012 Summer Olympics in London, finishing with a time of 28.44 seconds in 52nd place in the heats. She also represented Uganda at the Rio 2016 Olympics.

Education and Background 
Jamila Lunkuse is one of  4 children born to Yusuf and Janat Nansubuga Nsibambi. She joined Plymouth College in 2013 on a sports scholarship before attending the University of Brighton to study Business and Marketing.

Notable Achievements 
In 2013, Jamila Lunkuse won eight medals at  the CANA Zone 3 and 4 Swimming Championships that were held in Lusaka, Zambia. Jamila won 7 golds in the 50m breaststroke (competition record), 100m breaststroke, 200m breaststroke, 100m freestyle, 200m freestyle, 50m butterfly and 200m. Her silver medal was in the 50m freestyle.

Awards 

 2013 -  Rwenzori Uganda Sports Press Association Sportsman of the Month (April)

References

External links

1997 births
Living people
Ugandan female swimmers
Commonwealth Games competitors for Uganda
Swimmers at the 2010 Commonwealth Games
Swimmers at the 2014 Commonwealth Games
Olympic swimmers of Uganda
Swimmers at the 2012 Summer Olympics
Swimmers at the 2016 Summer Olympics
People educated at Plymouth College
Ugandan female freestyle swimmers
20th-century Ugandan women
21st-century Ugandan women